UN1TY (English: unity; yoo·nee·tee) is an Indonesian boygroup created by 1ID Music. The group currently has seven members: Fajri, Farhan, Fenly, Fiki, Gilang, Shandy, and Zweitson. Ricky is their ex-member, officially left on November 3, 2022 but being announced officially on December 14, 2022. UN1TY has started their debut with two released singles titled Coba Cintaku and Satu on December 9, 2019. Coba Cintaku reached 43rd rank on Billboard Indonesia Top 100 and 19th rank on Langit Musik Top 50 January 2020 edition. Satu reached 4th rank on Indonesia 20 15th edition by I-Radio Jakarta.

UN1TY's name is a reference to Indonesia's national motto Bhinneka Tunggal Ika (Unity in Diversity). The name represents teamwork and a desire to unite music fans.

Debut era

Formation 
UN1TY is a boygroup who started their debut under Famous All Stars through a music survival show by 1ID Music created by Dien Tirto Buwono, the business Innovation Director & Co-founder of Famous All Stars (FAS), and Patrick Effendy. After the camp opening their survival program on June 18, 2019, it eliminate and selected more than 500 candidates, until remaining eight candidates: Fajri, Farhan, Fenly, Fiki, Gilang, Ricky, Shandy, and Zweitson. They come from any different ethical backgrounds with age range 16 to 23 years old. This member formation was chosen because it considered to have musical chemistry and perfect personality fusion to create a synergy based on the producer's vision.

Early career 
UN1TY started their debut by launching two singles entitled Coba Cintaku and Satu (The One). According to digital music download, Coba Cintaku was launched on December 9, 2019, and Satu released on December 10, 2019. Coba Cintaku was written by Patrick Effendy, Bianca Nelwan, and Dimas Wibisana, while Satu was written only by Patrick Effendy. Coba Cintaku succeed to reach 43th rank on Billboard Indonesia Top 100 a month after the song was released and 19th rank on Langit Musik Top 50 January 2020 edition shortly afterwards. Similar to its counterpart, Satu managed to reach 4th rank on Indonesia 20 15th edition by I-Radio Jakarta.

UN1TY releasing their third single titled Pangeran Tidur (Sleeping Prince) on March 17, 2020. The song was written by Patrick Effendy and Dimas Wibisana.

On July 29, 2020, UN1TY releasing their fourth single titled Terbunuh Sepi (Killed by the Silence). The song was written by UN1TY members Patrick Effendy and Ifa Fachir. The song itself talking about loneliness, pointing out directly to teenage's inferiority complex caused of anxiety, depression, and inferiority complex that could make a teenage didn't trust themselves.

Fifth single of UN1TY entitled No Mellow! released in digital streaming platforms on September 23, 2020, but the music video is released on September 25, 2020, on YouTube. The music video was recorded only with smartphone, showing the dynamic and playful choreography as what the electronic pop-funk genre does, and the encouraging lyrics to reaching the listener's dream without hearing what other says. No Mellow! was written and created by UN1TY, Patrick Effendy, and STEVESMITH.

Works

Music concept 
For the debut, UN1TY wants to release 8 songs with different color and genre to shows every member (as their center) in every turns. This is also the first step for the group to introduce its eight members who have different talents and characters. In addition, UN1TY has ambitions to become a modern representation of Indonesian cultural values that are Bhinneka Tunggal Ika (unity in diversity). Showed by the personality and characteristics of every members, and the color of some typical Indonesian popular music with relevant lyrics.

Music style and genre 
UN1TY didn't trying to match or resembling South Korean boygroups that are really invaded Indonesian music industry. This group is performed with easy-listening pop music in the style of Indonesiam pop music and Indonesian-dominated lyrics. This group has the similar type of music color and genre with M.E, Trio Libels, AB Three, and Warna, compared to some other popular boygroup songs.

Philanthropy 
On April 1, 2020, UN1TY and V Live Indonesia create a V Paket #DiRumahAja campaign based on government's advice to stay at home during the COVID-19 pandemic. Through this program, the fans could meet their idol from the content given by them. In every content, this group is giving some advice on how important to stay at home to pass over the pandemic crisis. They do and made some fun contents when the fans are staying at home. Hopefully, the fans could follow and take a part to help the pandemic that caused by corona SARS-CoV-2 virus stopped.

On April 4, 2020, UN1TY performed on donation concert #TAYTB Live Stream Fest attended by Samara Live, MRA Media, and Bank OCBC NISP. This online-based festival is considered as new alternative medium for Indonesia's live event industry in the middle of COVID-19 virus pandemic. This festival is having a collaboration with Yayasan Benih Baik to spread and support for helping Indonesian who susceptible to infected by COVID-19 through giving donations during the festival. These donations is used for funds and Bantuan Langsung Tunai for some needed citizens during the pandemic. Afterwards, on April 18, UN1TY performed on donation concert #ApapunDiRumahAja Live Stream Fest Vol. 2 attended by Samara Live, MRA Media, FAS, and Tehbotol Sosro.

Samara Live, MRA Media, and Bank OCBC NISP. This online-based festival is considered as new alternative medium for Indonesia's live event industry in the middle of COVID-19 virus pandemic. This festival is having a collaboration with Yayasan Benih Baik ti spread and support for helping Indonesian who susceptible to infected by COVID-19 through giving donations during the festival. These donations is used for funds and Bantuan Langsung Tunai for some needed citizens during the pandemic. Afterwards, on April 18, UN1TY performed on donation concert #ApapunDiRumahAja Live Stream Fest Vol. 2 attended by Samara Live, MRA Media, FAS, and Tehbotol Sosro.

Members

Web series

Discography

Single

Music videos 
(including collaborations)

References

External links 
 
 
 
 

2019 establishments in Indonesia
Electronic dance music groups
Musical groups established in 2019
Musical groups from Jakarta
Indonesian boy bands